Johannes Wolfgang Rohen (18 September 1921 – 26 May 2022) was a German anatomist. 

Born in Münster on 18 September 1921, he was mostly known for his photographic atlas of human anatomy cadaver dissection, Color Atlas of Anatomy - A Photographic Study of the Human Body, one of the most widely used atlases in the field. It has been translated into 18 languages. The 18th translated language is Korean. Rohen died on 26 May 2022, at the age of 100.

Works
Rohen, Johannes W. (2011) Anatomie des Menschen - Fotografischer Atlas der systematischen und topografischen Anatomie 7th Edition, published by Schattauer,

References

External links

 

1921 births
2022 deaths
Medical illustrators
German anatomists
German centenarians
German embryologists
20th-century German physicians
University of Tübingen alumni
Academic staff of the University of Erlangen-Nuremberg
Academic staff of the University of Marburg
Academic staff of the University of Giessen
Academic staff of Johannes Gutenberg University Mainz
People from Münster
Medical school textbook writers
People from the Province of Westphalia
Men centenarians